Rear Admiral Hon. Albert Denison Somerville Denison (4 October 1835 – 2 September 1903) was an officer in the British Royal Navy who served in China during the Second Opium War and received a medal for his service.

Early life
Albert Denison was born on 4 October 1835, the second son of Albert Denison, 1st Baron Londesborough, and the Hon. Henrietta Weld-Forester (a daughter of the 1st Baron Forester). He had a brother, Harold Albert Denison.

Family
In 1873 he married Louisa Fanny Crichlow Fabris. His daughter, the Honourable Daisy Denison, married Robert Lockhart Hobson of the British Museum in 1900. In 1938, Daisy was granted the title as a Baron's daughter which would have been hers had her father survived to succeed as Lord Londesborough. She died in 1967. He had two other daughters, Ivy, who married Herbert Guy Sturges Mitchison, and Lily, who married Reginald Marsh Everett. Both were also declared Honourable on the same basis as Daisy. After the most senior line to the Londesborough barony failed, his son Ernest succeeded to the title in 1937.

Career
Denison joined the Royal Navy in 1849. He was appointed mate with a pass in seamanship in 1856. He was mate and subsequently acting lieutenant on the sloop  1856–59 when she served off China in the Second Opium War, being promoted to acting lieutenant in 1857 in consideration of successful operations against "Mandarin junks" in the Canton River and the attack on the fort and junk fleet at Fatsham Creek. He received the second China War Medal and clasp.

He was promoted to commander in 1866. He was placed on the retired list with the rank of captain in 1881 and subsequently promoted to the rank of rear admiral.

Death
Denison died on 2 September 1903. His residence at the time of his death was "Woodside", Wootton, Isle of Wight. Probate was granted in London to his brother Harold Albert Denison and Gerald Otho Fitzgerald on an estate of £14,085.

See also
Cormorant-class gunvessel

References 

Royal Navy officers
Younger sons of barons
1835 births
1903 deaths